Abiteboul is a surname. Notable people with the surname include:

 Cyril Abiteboul (born 1977), French motor racing engineer and manager
 Michaël Abiteboul, French actor
 Serge Abiteboul (born 1953), French computer scientist

See also
 Jewish name, paragraph about Oriental Jewish names
Other variations of the name:
 Abitbol
 Abutbul
 Botbol, with a comprehensive etymology

Maghrebi Jewish surnames
Arabic-language surnames
Surnames of Moroccan origin